Ruth J. Emilie Lowinsky (née Hirsch; 1893–1958) was an English society hostess and food writer. Her husband, the surrealist Thomas Esmond Lowinsky, provided illustrations for her first book, Lovely Food (1931), published by the Nonesuch Press on hand-made paper.

Life
Lowinsky was the daughter of Leopold Hirsch (1867–1932), a London banker and art collector. She studied at the Slade School of Fine Art before giving up painting on her marriage, and setting up home in Kensington Square. A friend of Rebecca West and Raymond Mortimer, she died in January 1958.

Works
 Lovely food: a cookery notebook, London: The Nonesuch Press, 1931. Illustrated with line drawings by Thomas Lowinsky.
 More lovely food, London: The Nonesuch Press, 1935
 What's cooking? recipes for the keen and thrifty, London: Secker & Warburg, 1945
 Food for pleasure: an anthology of recipes, London: Hart-Davis, 1950. Dedicated to Ethel Sands and Raymond Mortimer.
 Russian food for pleasure, modern recipes, London: Hart-Davis, 1953

References

External links
 Ken Hall, Ruth Lowinsky by Eric Gill, 15 July 2013

1893 births
1958 deaths
English food writers
Women food writers
Women cookbook writers
Alumni of the Slade School of Fine Art